Edward Webb (1779–1839), of Adwell, near Tetsworth, Gloucestershire and 181 Piccadilly, Middlesex, was a politician.

He was a Member (MP) for Gloucester on 1 October 1816 – 1832.

References

1779 births
1839 deaths
People from South Oxfordshire District
UK MPs 1812–1818
UK MPs 1818–1820
UK MPs 1820–1826
UK MPs 1826–1830
UK MPs 1830–1831
UK MPs 1831–1832
Members of the Parliament of the United Kingdom for English constituencies
People from Thame
People from Gloucestershire